Bakilid can refer to the following places in the Philippines:

 Bakilid, Mandaue, a barangay in the city of Mandaue
 Bakilid, a barangay in the municipality of Dimiao, Bohol